Quercus canariensis, the Algerian oak, Mirbeck's oak or zean oak, is an oak native to southern Portugal, Spain, Tunisia, Algeria and Morocco. Despite the scientific name, it does not occur naturally today in the Canary Islands, though it may have in the past. It is placed in section Quercus.

Description
The flowers are catkins; the fruit is an acorn 2.5 cm long and 2 cm broad, in a shallow cup.

The tree is a recipient of the Royal Horticultural Society's Award of Garden Merit.

Landmark specimens

Grand old Algerian oak tree was planted on 19 May 1863. It resides within the Kyneton Botanical Gardens in the town of Kyneton in the Australian state of Victoria. This tree is listed by the National Trust on the Register of Significant Trees in Victoria.
There are also two good specimens located in the Ballarat Botanical Gardens, one of which is believed to have been planted in 1920.
There was another significant old Algerian oak tree in Victoria at the Melbourne Royal Botanic Gardens. It was known as Lady Loch's Oak; its trunk split in half in November 2007, due to the weight of its giant old limbs. The tree has been extensively planted in Canberra.

There are over a dozen mature trees in St Vincent Gardens, Albert Park, Victoria, some possibly dating back to the late 19th to early 20th century.

References

External links

canariensis
Flora of North Africa
Trees of Algeria
Trees of Morocco
Flora of Spain
Flora of Portugal
Trees of Mediterranean climate
Plants described in 1809